Cowans Ford Hydroelectric Station is a hydroelectric power plant and dam located near Huntersville, North Carolina, approximately 20 miles north of Charlotte on Lake Norman. It is the largest conventional hydro station owned by Duke Energy, generating up to 350 MW of power.

Three units began generating electricity in 1963, with a fourth unit beginning operation in 1967. They supply "peaking power"—extra electricity needed to meet demand when it is needed most—typically hot summer days and cold winter mornings.

Cowans Ford Dam impounds the Catawba River to create Lake Norman, the largest man-made body of fresh water in North Carolina. The lake provides water to Lincoln County and the communities of Davidson, Mooresville, Charlotte and Huntersville.  The lake was named for former Duke Power president Norman Cocke.

See also

 Battle of Cowan's Ford

References

Hydroelectric power plants in North Carolina
Buildings and structures in Lincoln County, North Carolina
Buildings and structures in Mecklenburg County, North Carolina
Dams in North Carolina
Dams on the Catawba River
Duke Energy dams
Dams completed in 1963
Energy infrastructure completed in 1963
Energy infrastructure completed in 1967
1963 establishments in North Carolina